El Bordo or El Bordo Rock is a rock band from Buenos Aires. Its name comes from a well-known wine market.

History
In 1998 a group of high school students joined together to play at a birthday party. This marked the beginning of the band.

The lineup was Alejandro Kurz (guitar and voice), Miguel Soifer alias El Maestro (Drums), Pablo Spivak (bass) and Mariano Botti (manager). 

Their first significant performance was at La Colorada on 11/17/98 for a crowd of about fifty people.

Members
Alejandro Kurz: Vocals and rhythm guitar
Diego Kurz: Lead guitar and backing vocals
Leandro Kohon: Harmonica
Miguel Soifer: Drums and percussion
Pablo Spivak: Bass

Discography

Escupiendo verdades (demo), 2000
Demo album with 11 tunes.
Escupiendo verdades (Spitting Truths)
Soy inmortal (I'm immortal)
Tipo nuevo (New guy)
Sultán del capo
Muriendo con mi corazón (Dying with my heart)
Rock n' Roll Hepático (Hepatic Rock 'n' Roll)
Como vos (Like you)
Matanga

Paso a paso (demo), 2001
Demo album with 4 new songs.
De nada ( You're Welcome)
Escupiendo verdades (Spitting Truths)
Soy inmortal (I'm immortal)
Sultán del capo
Hasta el fin (To the end)
Matanga
Arriba con mi corazón (Up with my heart)
Muriendo a la noche (Dying at night)
Como vos (Like you)
El fondo del tacho (The bottom of the tin)
Tipo nuevo (New guy)

Carnaval de las heridas, 2002
First production record
Soy inmortal (I'm immortal)
Los perdidos (The lost ones)
Aquella nochecita (That little night)
De nada (You're Welcome)
Escupiendo verdades (Spitting Truths)
Blues de matanga (Matanga's Blues)
Tipo nuevo (New guy)
Olvido (Forgetfulness)
Como vos (Like you)
Arriba con mi corazón (Up with my heart)
El traicionero (The treacherous)

Un grito en el viento, 2004

A mi favor (In My Favor)
Quiero ver (I want to see)
Te devoran (They devour to you)
Volando (Flying)
Donde voy (Where I go)
El grito (The shout)
Me da igual (That gives me the same)
Con el cuerpo a la mitad (With the body to half)
Mal trago (Rough Patch)
Chapita (crazy)
Volviendo al sol (Returning to the sun)
De vuelta al juego (Back in the game)

En la vereda de enfrente, 2006
En la vereda (On The Lane)
De tanto en tanto (Every Now And Then)
Silbando una ilusión (Whistling an illusion)
Cansado de ser (Tired of being)
Así (In This Way)
Siempre (Always)
El Insatisfecho  (The unsatisfied)
Intro peatonal
Tesoro (Treasure)
La Patada (The Kick)
El Día no me avisó (The day didn't tell me)
Jazz barrial (Mudhole Jazz)
Sentado en la luna (Sitting on the moon)

Yacanto, 2008
 El regreso (The Return)
 No quiero (I Don't Want To)
 La banda (The Band)
 Noche extraña (Strange Night)
 El carnaval de la eterna tristeza (The Carnival Of The Eternal Sadness)
 Guerreros del viento (Warriors Of The Wind)
 Vientos de locura (Airs Of Madness)
 Soñando despierto (Dreaming Awake)
 Dejar caer el sol (Letting The Sun Fall Down)
 Puerto escondido (frente a la locura) (Hiding Port (In Front Of Madness))
 El silencio del caos infernal  (Silence Of The Infernal Chaos)

Historias Perdidas, 2010
 Buscando (Searching)
 Siento (el cielo va a brillar) (I Feel (The Sky Will Shine))
 Río (River)
 Destrozar tus ojos (Smash Your Eyes)
 Pensando en vos (parte I) (Thinking Of You (Part I))
 Desaparecer (parte II) (Disappear (Part II))
 Llueve en Buenos Aires (It Rains In Buenos Aires)
 Medallitas (Little Medals)
 ¿A dónde vas? (Where Are You Going?)
 Donde vagan los sueños (Where The Dreams Prowls)
 Sueños de libertad (Dreams Of Freedom)

Hermanos, 2014
 Existir
 Instinto
 Sobrio
 Madre Tierra
 Chico Invisible
 Lejos
 Huellas
 Descerebrados
 En mi Locura
 Paseo Lunar
 Hermanos

See also
Callejeros

External links
Official Webpage
El bordo was born from the wine (Periodistic article)
Info about the band

Argentine rock music groups